Abhay Bhushan Pandey (born 23 November 1944) is an Indian computer scientist. Bhushan has been a major contributor to the development of the Internet TCP/IP architecture, and is the author of the File Transfer Protocol (which he started working on while he was a student at IIT-Kanpur) and the early versions of email protocols. He is currently chairman of Asquare Inc., Secretary of Indians for Collective Action and the former President of the IIT-Kanpur Foundation.

Early life and career
Abhay Bhushan Pandey was born in a Hindu Brahmin family in Allahabad, Uttar Pradesh. Bhushan is a graduate of the first batch (1960–65) from the Indian Institute of Technology Kanpur, receiving a B.Tech. in electrical engineering. Subsequently, he studied at the Massachusetts Institute of Technology, where he received a Masters in electrical engineering together with a degree in Management from the MIT Sloan School of Management. At MIT, he drafted the now famous  and worked on developing FTP and E-mail protocols for the ARPANet and subsequent Internet. In 1978 he was a Director at the Institute of Engineering and Rural Technology in Allahabad and was also a senior manager in Engineering and Development of Xerox where he was a founder and manager of the Xerox Environmental Leadership. He also was a co-founder of both the YieldUP International which in 1995 went public on NASDAQ and Portola Communications, which was bought by Netscape in 1997.

References

Indian computer scientists
MIT School of Engineering alumni
Living people
IIT Kanpur alumni
MIT Sloan School of Management alumni
1944 births